Şendere is a village in the Pazar District, Rize Province, in Black Sea Region of Turkey. Its population is 133 (2021).

History 
According to list of villages in Laz language book (2009), name of the village is Bogina, which means "highland house" in Laz language. Most villagers are ethnically Hemshin.

Geography

References

Villages in Pazar District, Rize